DJ Switch may refer to:

 Switch (house DJ), real name Dave Taylor, a house DJ from the United Kingdom
 Switch (hip-hop DJ), real name Anthony Culverwell, a turntablist DMC champion hip-hop DJ from the United Kingdom
 DJ Switch (Ghana) (Erica Armah Bra-Bulu Tandoh) (born 2007), a Ghanaian DJ
 DJ Switch (Nigeria) (Obianuju Catherine Udeh), a Nigerian DJ